Littoral zone is an area near the coastline of a body of water.

Littoral or Litoral may also refer to:

Geography

Current entities
Littoral (Benin), a department of Benin
Litoral (Bolivia), a province of Oruro Department, Bolivia
Litoral (Equatorial Guinea), a province of Equatorial Guinea
Littoral Region (Cameroon), a region of Cameroon
A region of the mouth of the St. Lawrence River; see Bas-Saint-Laurent

Historical entities and informal regions
Austrian Littoral (Küstenland), a crown land of Austria-Hungary
Littoral Banovina, a province of the former Kingdom of Yugoslavia
Croatian Littoral
Pontic littoral, the littoral zone of the Black Sea
Mediterranean littoral
Argentine Littoral, another name for Mesopotamia, Argentina
Slovene Littoral, an informal province of Slovenia
Litoral Department, a former territory of Bolivia
Montenegrin Littoral

Other
Littoral (military), a type of military operation
Littoral combat ship, a class of warship presently being considered by the US Navy
Littoral rights, legal term for access and use rights to ocean shoreline 
Club Deportivo Litoral (Cochabamba), a Bolivian football club
Club Deportivo Litoral (La Paz), a Bolivian football club